The 1982 United States Senate election in Utah took place on November 2, 1982, concurrently with other elections to the United States Senate and United States House of Representatives, as well as various State and Local elections. Republican Orrin Hatch won re-election against Democratic challenger Ted Wilson. As of 2022, this is the last time a Democrat won more than 40% in a Utah Senate election.

Major Candidates

Democratic
Ted Wilson, Mayor of Salt Lake City

Republican
Orrin Hatch, incumbent Senator

Results

See also
1982 United States Senate elections

References

1982
United States Senate
Utah